John Humffreys Parry (24 January 1816 – 10 January 1880) was a British barrister, who became serjeant-at-law.

Early life
The son of John Humffreys Parry the antiquarian (1786–1825), he was born in London on 24 January 1816. He received a commercial education at the Philological School, Marylebone, and spent a short time in a merchant's office in London; but then took a post in the printed-book department in the British Museum. He attended lectures at the Aldersgate Institution and studied for the bar.

Legal career
Parry was called to the bar in June 1843 at the Middle Temple. On the home circuit he built up a good criminal business, principally at the Old Bailey and the Middlesex sessions. Appointment as a serjeant-at-law, in June 1856, led him to success also in the civil courts. He was also largely employed in compensation cases, especially for the London, Brighton, and South Coast Railway.

Parry obtained a patent of precedence in 1864 from Lord Westbury, and then led the home circuit. In November 1878 he was elected a bencher of the Middle Temple. His best-known cases were the trial of Manning in 1849; of Franz Müller, for the murder of Mr. Briggs, in October 1864; the Overend and Gurney prosecution in 1869; the indictment of Arthur Orton the Tichborne claimant, in 1873–4; and Whistler v. Ruskin in November 1878.

Political views
In politics Parry was a Radical—or advanced liberal—and at the time of the first Chartist movement he sympathised with some of their moderate views, and knew many of their leaders: William Lovett mentioned assistance received from him. Parry was also one of the founders of the Complete Suffrage Association in 1842.

In 1847 Parry unsuccessfully contested  against Lord Douro and Sir Samuel Morton Peto.

Death

Parry died on 10 January 1880 at his house in Holland Park, Kensington. He was buried at Brookwood Cemetery in Woking on 15 January 1880.

Family
Parry was twice married: first, to Margaret New, who died on 13 September 1856; and afterwards to Elizabeth Mead, daughter of Edwin Abbott; she predeceased him by a few hours. He had two sons, of whom the elder, John Humffreys, an actor, died in 1891; the second was Edward Abbott Parry, judge and man of letters.

Notes

Attribution

1816 births
1880 deaths
Welsh barristers
Serjeants-at-law (England)
Members of the Middle Temple
Burials at Brookwood Cemetery
People from London
19th-century English lawyers